The 2002 LG Chinese Football Super Cup (Chinese: LG杯2002年度中国足球超霸杯赛) was the 8th Chinese Football Super Cup, contested by Chinese Jia-A League 2002 winners Dalian Shide and 2002 Chinese FA Cup winners Qingdao Sbright. The match was played at the Wuhan Sports Center Stadium on 6 February 2003. Dalian Shide beat Qingdao Sbright 1–0, thus winning their third title of Super Cup.

Match details

References 

2002 in Chinese football
2002